Sacro Cuore di Gesù al Castro Pretorio is a Roman Catholic parish and titular church in Rome, Italy.

History

The church was originally projected by Pope Pius IX, the land being bought by him along the then Via di Porta San Lorenzo, now Via Marsala. His intention was to dedicate the church to Saint Joseph, who the Pope had declared 'Patron of the Universal Church' on 8 December 1870. In 1871, however he decided to dedicate the church to the Sacred Heart of Jesus. Work on the construction was begun, however, only under Pope Leo XIII, who named as architect Francesco Vespignani. Conte Francesco Vespignani (1842-1899), the Architetto dei Sacri Palazzi of Leo XIII, who also built the College of S. Anselmo on the Aventine Hill. However, the work came to a halt for lack of funds. At this point, the pope entrusted the work to Don Bosco St John Bosco. With the pope's permission, Don Bosco bought an additional 5,500 sq.m. of land to construct a boarding school for poor boys, and also a two floor building at the corner of via di Porta San Lorenzo (now via Marsala) and via Marghera that would serve as a residence for his Salesians. Don Bosco managed to collect the funds necessary for the construction of the church, by appealing to the Catholic world and by making personal journeys to France and to Spain, despite failing health. The church was consecrated on 14 May 1887.

The campanile (bell tower) was projected by Francesco Vespignani, but remained incomplete until 1931, when the imposing statue of the Sacred Heart, donated by the Salesian past pupils in Argentina, was placed on it.  

Dedicated to the Sacred Heart of Jesus, the church is served by the Salesian fathers and brothers. It used to have an adjoining  trade school with a hostel. At the death of Don Bosco, only the church and the building on via Marsala had been completed. Under his successor Don Michele Rua, the wings on via Marghera and via Magenta were constructed. When the trade school closed down, its place was taken by a middle school and a 'Ginnasio e Liceo Classico.' It later became the provincial house of the Salesian province (first the IRO and later the ICC) and the offices of the CNOS (Centro Nazionale Opere Salesiane). Since 2017, it is the seat of the central government of the Salesian Congregation. The complex hosts also a significant work for young migrants, volunteers and university students, along with an innovative hostel for young people managed by the Salesians and the 'Missionarie di Cristo Risorto.'  

The church was elevated to the status of a minor basilica in 1921.

Cardinal-Deacons
The Church of Sacro Cuore was established as a Deaconry on 5 February 1965 by Pope Paul VI, in anticipation of his creating twenty-seven new cardinals on 28 February 1965.
Maximilien de Fürstenberg  (pro hac vice to title for a Cardinal Priest) (26 Jun 1967 - 22 Sep 1988 )
Giovanni Saldarini  (pro hac vice to title for a Cardinal Priest) (28 Jun 1991 - 18 Apr 2011 )
Giuseppe Versaldi Cardinal Deacon (18 Feb 2012 - )

Gallery

Notes

References
 Massimo Alemanno, Le chiese di Roma moderna Vol I (Roma : Armando, 2004). pp. 27–31.
 
 
 Antonio Sperduti, Monumento di Don Bosco alla Cattedra di Pietro (Genova: B.N. Marconi, 2012).

External links

Religious organizations established in 1887
Basilica churches in Rome
Sacro Cuore Jesu Castro
Churches completed in 1887
19th-century Roman Catholic church buildings in Italy
Salesian churches in Italy
1887 establishments in Italy
Cuore di Gesu